Andorra competed at the 2022 European Championships in Munich from August 15 to August 22, 2022.

Results

Andorra entered the following athletes.  
 Men 
 Track and road

See also
Andorra at the 2022 European Championships

References

2022
Nations at the 2022 European Athletics Championships
European Athletics Championships